5,7,4'-Trimethoxyflavan is a flavan, a type of flavonoid. It can be found in Xanthorrhoea preissii.

References

External links 

O-methylated flavans